Wick-A-Te-Wah (or Wic-a-te-wah) is an unincorporated summer resort area of Onekama Township, Manistee County in the U.S. state of Michigan.

History
Mr. H. Ward Leonard, a developer from Manistee, developed this area as a summer resort in the early 1900s. In 1917, Leonard issued a brochure describing the property and the availability of lots for sale.

Festivities
The annual Fourth of July Wick-A-Te-Wah Parade is considered by many to be one of the best Fourth of July parades in Michigan, drawing considerable crowds and extensive neighborhood participation.

References

Further reading
 Heidi Berg, "Wick-A-Te-Wah," in Wellspring: Interesting interviews... The way things were... (Manistee: J.B. Publications, 1992), vol. 2, pp. 23–26.

Unincorporated communities in Manistee County, Michigan
Unincorporated communities in Michigan